Binalong Bay is a rural locality in the local government area (LGA) of Break O'Day in the North-east LGA region of Tasmania. The 2016 census recorded a population of 290 for the state suburb of Binalong Bay.

It is a small coastal town in north-east Tasmania, situated at the southern end of the Bay of Fires. Originally a fishing hamlet, the town is now a village with a large proportion of holiday dwellings. It has a beach, small harbour (known as the gulch) and a cafe.

History 
Binalong Bay was gazetted as a locality in 1964. Originally known as Boat Harbour, the current name was adopted in 1944. It is believed to be the Aboriginal name.

Binalong Bay Post Office opened on 30 March 1966 and closed in 1973.

Geography
The waters of the Bay of Fires, part of the Tasman Sea, form part of the eastern boundary. The Tasman Sea and the waters of Georges Bay complete the eastern boundary and form part of the southern. Grants Lagoon, an inlet of Binalong Bay (the body of water) is surrounded by the locality.

Road infrastructure 
Route C850 (Binalong Bay Road) enters from the south-west and runs through to the east, where it ends. Route C848 (Gardens Road) starts at an intersection with C850 and runs north until it exits. Route C849 (Reids Road) starts at an intersection with C848 and runs west until it exits.

Gallery

References

Towns in Tasmania
Localities of Break O'Day Council